The 2019 Taça de Portugal Final was the last match of the 2018–19 Taça de Portugal, which decided the winners of the 79th season of the Taça de Portugal. It was played on 25 May 2019 at the Estádio Nacional in Oeiras, between Sporting CP and Porto.

The defending champions were Desportivo das Aves, however, they were knocked out in the quarter-finals by Braga.

Route to the final

Note: H = home fixture, A = away fixture

Broadcasting
The match will be broadcast in Portugal on television by both competition's broadcasting partners: RTP (on RTP1) and SportTV (on SportTV 1).

Match

Details

References

2018–19 in Portuguese football

Sporting CP matches

2018
FC Porto matches
May 2019 sports events in Portugal
Taça de Portugal Final 2019